Millsian may refer to:
A molecular modeling program from Blacklight Power
The philosophy of John Stuart Mill